Stichting Topbasketball Lingewaard, for sponsorships reason named Lekdetec.nl Bemmel, is a Dutch professional women's basketball team based in Bemmel.  The team is the professional women's section of Batouwe Basketball and was founded in 2010 as Lekdetec. The team has won the WBL twice, in 2015 and 2017.

Honours
Women's Basketball League
Champions (2): 2014–15, 2016–17
Carla de Liefde Trophy
Winners (3): 2012, 2016, 2017
WBL Final Four
Winners (1): 2018
Supercup
Winners (1): 2015

Notable players
Tanya Bröring (2011)

Basketball teams established in 2010
Women's basketball teams in the Netherlands